Ku Cheng-ting (24 October 1903 – 1 November 1974) was a Chinese-born politician, also known by the courtesy name Ming-shu'''.

Ku was a native of Anshun. After graduating from the University of Berlin, Ko Cheng-ting enrolled at the Moscow Sun Yat-sen University in 1925. He was appointed to the Control Yuan in 1932, and became a member of the Central Committee of the Kuomintang in 1937. Ku also served in several other posts during the Second Sino-Japanese War. After the constitution went into effect, both were elected to the Legislative Yuan in 1948. The couple relocated to Taiwan during the Chinese Civil War. In 1952, Ku returned to a committee posting within the Kuomintang. He died in Taipei of cancer in 1974. Ku had 5 children: Anna Marie, Nelson, George, John, and Peter.

References

1903 births
1974 deaths
Kuomintang Members of the Legislative Yuan in Taiwan
Members of the 1st Legislative Yuan
Members of the 1st Legislative Yuan in Taiwan
Members of the Control Yuan
Deaths from cancer in Taiwan
Humboldt University of Berlin alumni
Moscow Sun Yat-sen University alumni
People from Anshun
Taiwanese people from Guizhou
Republic of China politicians from Guizhou
Spouses of Taiwanese politicians
Spouses of Chinese politicians